Menathais is a genus of sea snails, marine gastropod mollusks, in the family Muricidae, the murex snails or rock snails.

Species
Species within the genus Menathais include:
 Menathais bimaculata (Jonas, 1845)
 Menathais intermedia (Kiener, 1836)
 Menathais tuberosa (Röding, 1798)
 † Menathais viciani Kovács, 2018

References

External links
 Iredale, T. (1937). Mollusca. In: Whitley, G. P. (ed). Middleton and Elizabeth Reefs, South Pacific Ocean. Australian Zoologist. 8(4): 232-261, pls 15-17

 
Gastropods described in 1937